Kreishauptmannschaft Bautzen was a Kreishauptmannschaft or administrative district in the Kingdom of Saxony. It was founded in 1835 and continued under the Free State of Saxony until  abolished in 1934. 

Kreishauptmannschaft Bautzen issued the Roman numeral I to road vehicles licensed there. In 1906 the Saoxon authorities refused to add additional letters, in line with vehicle licensing reforms introduced in line with the rest of the German Empire.

References

Kreishauptmannschaft